The Aerospace Operations Command ( - COMAE) is a Brazilian air and space command created in 2017 and is part of the Brazilian Air Force. Is responsible for planning, coordinating, executing and controlling the country's air and space operations. The Brazilian Navy and Brazilian Army also are part of the organization.

Mission
The COMAE was formed as a Brazilian Air Force command with the main mission of oversee all air and space operations in the country and includes personnel from the Brazilian Army and Brazilian Navy. Other missions include the operations of satellites in orbit for imagery intelligence, military communications, reconnaissance and earth observation roles in joint operation with the Brazilian Space Agency and the National Institute for Space Research from the Space Operations Center (COPE), and other facilities in the country, also orbital and sub-orbital launches from the Alcântara Space Center. The organization also contributes to the sovereignty of airspace and to the integration of the national territory through air tracking systems such the CINDACTA, similitar system to the North American NORAD.

Brazilian aerospace assets

The Brazilian Armed Forces and other federal agencies possesses several major aerospace military and scientific assets:

Satellites
Earth observation and reconnaissance:
CBERS - 2 in operation, 3 retired
SCD - 2 in operation
GEOMET - 1 planned
Military communications and multi-mission platform:
SGDC - 1 in operation, more 1 planned
Amazônia - 1 in operation, more 2 planned
Lessonia - 2 in operation
SABIA-Mar - 2 planned
Remote sensing:
Carponis - 1 planned
Space weather:
LATTES - 1 planned

Orbital and sub-orbital launchers
Orbital launchers:
VLM-1
VLM S-50
Sub-orbital launchers:
VSB-30
Hypersonic sub-orbital vehicle
14-X

Telescopes
Radio telescope:
Baryon Acoustic Oscillations in Neutral Gas Observations (BINGO)

Launching facilities
Spaceport:
Alcântara Space Center
Rocket base:
Barreira do Inferno Launch Center

Air, space and border control
Space control centers:
Space Operations Center (COPE)
Secondary Space Operations Center (COPE-S)
Satellite Tracking and Control Center (CRC)
Airspace defense control centers:
Integrated Air Traffic Control and Air Defense Center (CINDACTA)
Datalink:
Link-BR2
Territorial and border control:
SISFRON system
SisGAAz system

International cooperation

Artemis program
The country and its federal agencies are part of the NASA's Artemis Program and signatory to the Artemis Accords. Also several companies are based in Alcântara, with the objective of orbital and sub-orbital launches, for commercial purposes or in partnership with the Brazilian government.

Satellite constellation
The Brazilian Space Agency signed cooperation agreements with space agencies of BRICS (Brazil, Russia, India, China and South Africa), to the joint-development of a remote sensing satellite constellation, aiming to help with common challenges for the mankind such as the climate change, major disasters and environmental protection. Ground stations located in Cuiabá in Brazil, Moscow Region in Russia, Shadnagar–Hyderabad in India, Sanya in China and Hartebeesthoek in South Africa will receive data from the satellite constellation.

See also

 Brazilian Armed Forces
 Brazilian Air Force
 Brazilian Space Agency

External links
 Brazilian Air Force
 Brazilian Ministry of Defense

References 

Commands of the Brazilian Armed Forces
Joint military units and formations
Space units and formations